Elena Paneska (born 10 July 2002) is a Macedonian footballer who plays as a defender and midfielder for Kamenica Sasa and the North Macedonia national team.

International career
Paneska made her debut for the North Macedonia national team on 25 November 2021, coming on as a substitute for Viktorija Nedeva against Northern Ireland.

References

2002 births
Living people
Women's association football defenders
Women's association football midfielders
Macedonian women's footballers
North Macedonia women's international footballers
ŽFK Dragon 2014 players
ŽFK Kamenica Sasa players